Termonmaguirk is a civil parish in County Tyrone, Northern Ireland. It is situated in the historic barony of Omagh East, with a small portion in Strabane Upper.

The Parish contains the following towns and villages:
Carrickmore
Drumnakilly
Loughmacrory
Sixmilecross

The Parish contains the following 53 townlands:

 

A
Aghagogan, Aghnaglea, Aghnagregan, Aghnanereagh, Altanagh, Altdrumman, Athenry

B
Ballintrain, Bancran, Bracky

C
Carrickmore, Cavanreagh, Clare, Cloghfin, Cooley, Copney, Creggan, Cregganconroe, Creggandevesky

D
Deroran, Derroar, Drumduff, Drumlister, Drumnakilly, Dunmisk

E
Eskerboy

G
Glen Upper, Gleneeny, Gortfin, Gortfinbar, Granagh

I
Inishative

L
Liskincon, Loughmacrory

M
Merchantstown Glebe, Mullanbeg, Mullanmore, Mulnafye

O
Old Church Yard, Oxtown

R
Ramackan

S
Sixmilecross, Skeboy, Sluggan, Streefe Glebe, Sultan

T
Tanderagee, Tiroony, Tonegan, Tremoge, Tursallagh

See also
List of civil parishes of County Tyrone
List of townlands in County Tyrone

References